Ilex dimorphophylla, the Okinawa holly, is a holly species endemic to Amami Ōshima of the Ryukyu Islands. It is compact shrub of up to 6 feet in height, with dense green leaves with spines towards the ends, and red berries. It is cultivated as a hedge in Europe and North America.

References 

dimorphophylla